Lim Heem Wei (born 12 April 1989) is a Singapore artistic gymnast. Lim represented Singapore in the London Olympic Games and the 2010 and 2014 Commonwealth Games. Wei is the first Singaporean gymnast to qualify for the Olympic Games. She achieved forty-fifth position in the women's artistic qualification event.

Lim retired from the sport in 2014. Subsequently, Lim returned as a judge during the 2017 SEA Games in Kuala Lumpur.

References

External links
 
 
 
 

Singaporean female artistic gymnasts
Gymnasts at the 2012 Summer Olympics
Olympic gymnasts of Singapore
Gymnasts at the 2006 Asian Games
Gymnasts at the 2010 Asian Games
Gymnasts at the 2014 Asian Games
1989 births
Living people
Commonwealth Games silver medallists for Singapore
Gymnasts at the 2010 Commonwealth Games
Commonwealth Games medallists in gymnastics
Southeast Asian Games gold medalists for Singapore
Southeast Asian Games silver medalists for Singapore
Southeast Asian Games bronze medalists for Singapore
Southeast Asian Games medalists in gymnastics
Competitors at the 2003 Southeast Asian Games
Competitors at the 2005 Southeast Asian Games
Competitors at the 2007 Southeast Asian Games
Competitors at the 2011 Southeast Asian Games
Asian Games competitors for Singapore
Medallists at the 2010 Commonwealth Games